The Union of Bookmakers' Employees (UBE) was a trade union in the United Kingdom. It merged with the Transport and General Workers' Union in 1974.The inaugural meeting was in Manchester Town Hall

See also

 List of trade unions
 Transport and General Workers' Union
 TGWU amalgamations

References
Arthur Ivor Marsh, Victoria Ryan. Historical Directory of Trade Unions, Volume 5 Ashgate Publishing, Ltd., Jan 1, 2006 pg. 437

External links
Catalogue of the UBE archives, held at the Modern Records Centre, University of Warwick

Defunct trade unions of the United Kingdom
Transport and General Workers' Union amalgamations
Trade unions disestablished in 1974